Mary Kinzie (born September 30, 1944) is an American poet.

Life
She received her B.A. from Northwestern University in 1967, and returned there to teach in 1975. She won Fulbright and Woodrow Wilson fellowships to do graduate work at the Free University of Berlin and Johns Hopkins University.

Kinzie won the Folger Shakespeare Library's 2008 O. B. Hardison, Jr. Poetry Prize, the only major American prize to recognize a poet for teaching as well as writing.

Bibliography

Poetry
 
 
 
 
 
 Masked Women (1990)

Essays
  (which includes the influential and controversial essay "The Rhapsodic Fallacy").

Theory

References

External links
An interview with Mary Kinzie and audio clips of her reading three of her poems at the National Humanities Center
Mary Kinzie's homepage at Northwestern University

1944 births
Living people
Formalist poets
American women poets
Northwestern University alumni
Johns Hopkins University alumni
Northwestern University faculty
20th-century American poets
20th-century American women writers
American women academics